Judith Briles is an author, publisher, podcaster, book publishing consultant and professional speaker focused in the fields of book publishing, conflict resolution, and personal finance.

She is best known for being The Book Shepherd and the founder of AuthorYOU, the co-founder of Mile High Press, and was CW2 Denver's financial expert in the mid-2000s. Briles has been referred to as " The Book Shepherd" and is an advocate for author's rights, works with clients globally and leads the Book Publishing and Speaking Unplugged bootcamps. In 2019, She launched the Colorado Authors' Hall of Fame.

Background
Briles has earned both masters and doctorate of Business Administration degrees. In 2004, she was named the Woman of Distinction by the Girl Scouts of the United States of America.

Career
Briles is a Book Publishing Expert and Inspirational Book Coach. She is the co-founder of Mile High Press, Ltd., a small press and The Briles Group, Inc., a former Colorado-based research, training and consulting firm. She is the President of The Book Shepherd, a consulting and implementation firm that works with authors and small publishers that was created in 2000 educating and assisting authors globally in the creation and successful publication of their books. In 2009, she founded AuthorU, a nonprofit 501(c)6 membership organization for authors. She founded the 501(c)3 Colorado Authors Hall of Fame with its first induction to twenty-one authors in September 2019.

Briles is an author of over thirty books, earning over forty book awards, including her publishing series that features the titles: ''How to Create a $1,000,000 Speech, AuthorYOU-Creating and Building Your Author and Book Platforms, The CrowdFunding Guide for Authors & Writers, How to Avoid 101 Book Publishing Blunders Bloopers & Boo-Boos, How to Create a $1,000,000 Speech and Snappy Sassy Salty-Wise Words for Authors & Writers. Show Me About Book Publishing with Rick Frishman and John Kremer, The Confidence Factor and Stabotage! She also travels internationally as a motivational speaker.

Her pioneering work on women and sabotage, specifically on how and why women undermine other women and the toxic workplace has been featured in The Wall Street Journal, Time, People, USA Today, Self, McCalls, Working Woman, Family Circle, The Washington Post, Newsweek and The New York Times. She is a frequent guest on national television and radio and has appeared on programs including CNN, CNNfn, Oprah, John Gray, MSNBC and Good Morning America.

Briles podcast, AuthorU-Your Guide to Book Publishing is carried on the ToginetRadioNetwork.com as well as

iTunes, Toginet Internet Radio, Stitcher, Blubrry, PlayerFM, MixCoud and iHeart Radio.

Select bibliography

Briles, Judith (2014). Snappy Sassy Salty: Wise Words for Authors & Writers. Denver, CO: Mile High Press, pp 144 pages. .
Briles, Judith (2015). The Crowdfunding Guide for Authors & Writers. Denver, CO: Mile High Press, pp 92 pages. .
Briles, Judith (2016). How to Avoid 1010 Book Publishing Blunders, Bloopers & Boo-Boos. Denver, CO: Mile High Press, pp 328 pages. .
Briles, Judith (2018). How to Create a $1,000,000 Speech. Denver, CO: Mile High Press, pp 298 pages. .
Briles, Judith (2019). When God Says NO: Revealing the YES When Adversity and Loss Are Present. Denver, CO: Mile High Press, pp 264 pages. .

References

External links
 Dr. Judith Briles Official site
 Colorado Authors Hall of Fame
The Book Shepherd
 Mile High Press

American businesspeople
Living people
American women writers
Writers from Denver
Pepperdine University alumni
1946 births
21st-century American women